Marcellus as Hermes Logios is a sculpture of Marcellus the Younger as Hermes Logios, the god of eloquence. It was executed in marble (1.80 meters in height) circa 20 BC (i.e. 2 years after the nominal subject's death, possibly on his uncle Augustus's personal order as a funerary monument), and was signed by Cleomenes the Athenian.

Before 1590 it was housed in Pope Sixtus V's villa on the Esquiline Hill.  It was bought from the papal collections in 1664 by Louis XIV of France and placed in the "galerie des Glaces" at the Palace of Versailles.  Napoleon brought it from there to the Louvre, Paris in 1802, where it now resides.

External links

Louvre site

Augustan sculptures
Ancient Greek and Roman sculptures of the Louvre
Hellenistic-style Roman sculptures
Marble sculptures in France
1st-century BC Roman sculptures
Archaeological discoveries in Italy